The spikey bass (Hypopterus macropterus)  is a species of ray-finned fish in the family Latidae, the lates perches. It is  endemic to coastal waters off Western Australia, where it inhabits areas with soft substrates. It is the only species in the monotypic genus Hypopterus.

Description
The spikey bass is an olive brown bass-like fish fading pale silvery below, each scale is marked with a dark oval spot and there are eight indistinct vertical bands along the head and body. This species has a deeper body than other species in the Latidae.

Etymology and taxonomy
The generic name Hypopterus derives from the Greek hypo (under) and pteron (wing or fin).This species was first formally described as Psammoperca macroptera in 1859 by the German born British zoologist Albert Günther (1830-1914), with the type locality given as "Victora", meaning Port Essington in the Northern Territory but is actually thought to be Shark Bay in Western Australia. Theodore Nicholas Gill described the monospecific genus Hypopterus for this Australian endemic taxon in 1861.

References

Latidae
Marine fish of Western Australia

spikey bass
Taxa named by Albert Günther